Eyman is an Old English surname. Notable people with the surname include:

Frank Eyman (1898–1984), American prison warden
Scott Eyman (born 1951), American author, book editor, and art critic
Tim Eyman (born 1965), American political activist and businessman

English-language surnames